I Can't See Me Without You is the twenty-fourth studio album by American country music singer Conway Twitty. The album was released in 1972 by Decca Records.

Track listing

Charts

References

1972 albums
Conway Twitty albums
Decca Records albums
Albums produced by Owen Bradley